John Whitaker may refer to:

 John Whitaker (equestrian) (born 1955), English showjumper
 John Whitaker (gymnast) (1886–1977), English gymnast
 John Whitaker (historian) (1735–1808), English historian and Anglican clergyman
 John Whitaker (Iowa politician) (born 1956), American politician from Iowa

 John A. Whitaker (1901–1951), American politician from Kentucky
 John N. Whitaker (1940–2001), American neurologist and immunologist
 John Thompson Whitaker (1906–1946), American writer and journalist
 Johnny Whitaker (born 1959), American actor
 Jack Whitaker (1924–2019), American sportscaster

See also
 John Whittaker (disambiguation)